The Helms Bakery on the border of Los Angeles and Culver City, California, was a notable industrial bakery of Southern California that operated from 1931 to 1969. The buildings have now been adapted for reuse as retail shops, restaurants, and furniture showrooms; the complex is part of what is now called the Helms Bakery District.

History

Early history
In 1926, Paul Helms of New York took an early retirement for health reasons and moved his family to Southern California and its mild climate. Helms started construction on a building between Washington and Venice Boulevards in 1930 and, on March 2, 1931, the Helms Bakery opened with 32 employees and 11 delivery coaches (trucks).

By the next year, the Helms Bakery had become the "official baker" of the 1932 Summer Olympics when Paul Helms won a contract to supply bread for the 1932 games in Los Angeles. His slogan was "Olympic Games Bakers - Choice of Olympic Champions."  Four years later in time for the 1936 Summer Olympics Germany asked Helms for his bread recipes to feed to the German Olympic team. His relationship with Olympians continued in later years, the U.S. teams at London and Helsinki requested his bread be served. Early 
Helms vehicles sported the Olympic symbol, and it also appeared on, and was mentioned in, the Helms logo on the bread wrappers, the company logo and sign.

Expansion and new bakery in Montebello

Despite never being sold in stores, Helms baked products soon became known to millions of consumers.  The Helms motto was "Daily at Your Door" and every weekday morning, from both the Culver City facility and a second Helms Bakery site in Montebello, dozens of Helms coaches, painted in a unique two-tone scheme, would leave the bakery for various parts of the Los Angeles Basin, some going as far as the eastern San Gabriel Valley. This is remarkable because the network of freeways had not yet been built, so the trip might take an hour or more. One of each of these coaches is on display at the Petersen Automotive Museum in Los Angeles, Lyon Air Museum in Santa Ana, and the LeMay Car Museum in Tacoma, WA. In an apparent tribute to the Helms Bakery, a churro cart ("Willie's Churros") in Disney California Adventure is styled and painted to resemble a Helms delivery truck.

Each coach would travel through its assigned neighborhoods, with the driver periodically pulling (twice) on a large handle which sounded a distinctive whistle or stop at a house where a Helms sign, a blue placard with an "H" on it, was displayed in their windows.  Customers would come out and wave the coach down, or sometimes chase the coaches to adjacent streets.  Wooden drawers in the back of the coach were stocked with fresh donuts, cookies, pastries and candies, while the center section carried dozens of loaves of freshly baked bread.  Products often reached the buyers still warm from the oven.  Helms Bakery coaches were originally manufactured by Twin-Coach, a delivery truck firm in Kent, Ohio,  and were designed similar to that firm's buses, only smaller.  In the 1930s, the Fageol brothers merged Twin-Coach with Divco, another delivery truck maker based in Detroit, Michigan. Until WWII both Twin-Coach and early Divco vehicles were manufactured by the merged Divco-Twin Truck Company in a new factory opened in 1939 on Hoover Road in suburban Detroit.

In 1937 the firm had introduced a new, very modern looking (for the era) snub-nosed delivery vehicle based on a design similar to Chrysler's Airflow, which by WWII had captured most of the market for Divco. Trucks made with the older Twin-style bodies were discontinued when the factory switched to military parts in WWII, and were never resumed. The Twin name was dropped from the company at the same time. But Helms still wanted the older design which had become iconic to their home delivery business, so they bought unfinished snub-nosed chassis from Divco and had them finished with newly made older style bodies by several local California Truck body manufacturers. An example of this style truck may be found at the Petersen Automotive Museum in Los Angeles. Helms' later Divco chassis coaches were powered by various engines, including motors purchased from Nash and Studebaker.

Paul Helms died on January 5, 1957, at age 67, but the business continued to operate, run by family members. Its delivery network gradually grew to include Fresno to the north; San Bernardino to the east, and south to Orange County and San Diego.  In the company's final year of operation, a clever marketing campaign netted Helms a contract to furnish "the first bread on the moon," via the Apollo 11 space mission.  The San Bernardino facility was located on the northeast corner of Mt Vernon Avenue and Birch Street.  After Helm Bakeries closed that location, it was taken over as a small warehouse by FEDCO Corporation, which has since gone out of business as well.  The building in San Bernardino is still there, housing a mattress and home furnishings business.

Although popular, the Helms method of neighborhood delivery was doomed both by the expense of sending their coaches hundreds of miles each week and by the advent of the supermarket, which stocked products from other (less expensive) bakeries, which delivered once or twice each week.  The Helms company ceased operations in 1969.

Purchase by Marks family
The Marks family purchased Helms Bakery in the early 1970s and since then, they have completed a rare feat in Los Angeles - successful transformation and adaptive reuse of a historic structure.  Covering the 11 acres, the many improvements include restoring original neon signs on the roofs, creating two historic murals, installing two large photovoltaic solar arrays, restoring the Zigzag Moderne detailing, reinventing retail, home furnishings and eateries, as well as creating a home for top-flight media and arts related companies.  To honor the history of the bakery, a small museum was installed inside one of the retail stores.

The closure of Helms Avenue to through traffic created a new pedestrian plaza giving the neighborhood a much deserved community space, Helms Walk. The closed portion of Helms Avenue has been developed with trees, lawn areas, a water feature, free Wi-Fi, music and basalt pavers creating a new found space – a meeting place to sip coffee, chat with an old friend or simply “remember the day”. Helms Bakery's most recent addition closest to the Culver City station on the Expo Line is the newly created Helms Design Center. Featuring five to-the-trade contract showrooms with well-known brands such as Vitra, Louis Poulsen, Adotta, Bolon, Snowsound, and The Splash Lab, the center is a destination for commercial architects and designers. Lastly, a 200-car automated parking structure has been constructed, a first for Culver City, and in its making the bakery building continues to be a leader in civic mindedness with an eye to technological advances and innovations to the built environment and urban fabric.

Helms Bakery District today
There are several retail stores now located at the Helms Bakery District. There is a Helms Bakery Collectors Club, established as a resource for Helms fans to obtain literature, memorabilia and even Helms Coaches.

See also

 Helms Athletic Foundation

References

External links
 Helms Bakery District website
 Helms Bakery by Frank J. Leskovitz
 Location:  

Bakeries of California
Buildings and structures in Culver City, California
Industrial buildings and structures in California
Landmarks in Los Angeles
Companies based in Culver City, California
American companies established in 1931
Retail companies established in 1931
Food and drink companies established in 1931
Food and drink companies disestablished in 1969
1931 establishments in California
1969 disestablishments in California
Adaptive reuse of industrial structures in Greater Los Angeles